Falling Awake can refer to:

Music 
 "Falling Awake", a 1998 song by The Plimsouls from Kool Trash
 "Falling Awake", a 2004 song by The Color Morale from My Devil in Your Eyes
 "Falling Awake", a 2005 song by Shpongle from Nothing Lasts... But Nothing Is Lost
 "Falling Awake", a 2006 song by Gary Jules from Gary Jules
 "Falling Awake" (song), a 2010 song by Tarja Turunen
 "Falling Awake", a 2015 song by Kaiser Chiefs
 "Falling Awake" (album), a 2016 album by Goodnight, Sunrise

Other 
Falling Awake (poetry collection), a 2016 book by Alice Oswald
 Falling Awake, a 2004 romance novel by Jayne Ann Krentz
 Falling Awake (film), a 2009 American drama film